Sa Majesté Sanga Balende, is a football club that  plays in the Democratic Republic of Congo top tier: Vodacom Ligue 1. Sanga Balende is the only club in vodacom Ligue 1, that is from Kasai Oriental, This gives them a lot of popularity around the DRC amongst the people of Kasai Districts. They have one of the biggest fan base around the country. The club is based in the city of  Mbuji-Mayi.

History
The club was founded on 25 March 1962 under the name of Union Sud-Kasaienne, the name was changed to Nsanga Balende with Zairian authenticity. "Sa Majesté" means His Majesty. Among the co-founders are: Jonas Mukamba Kadiata Nzemba, Muela Kankonde and Nestor Lubula.

Honours
Linafoot
 Winners (1): 1983
 Runners-up (1): 2013–14
Coupe du Congo
 Runners-up (1): 2002 & 2021

Performance in CAF competitions
CAF Champions League: 1 appearance
2015 – Second Round

CAF Confederation Cup: 2 appearances
2015 – Second Round of 16
2017 – First round

Current squad
As of March 2015.

References

External links

Association football clubs established in 1961
Football clubs in the Democratic Republic of the Congo
Mbuji-Mayi
1961 establishments in the Republic of the Congo (Léopoldville)